Queen Elizabeth High School Rowing Club is a rowing club on the River Tyne, based at Tyne Green boathouse, Nr Hexham Bridge, Hexham, Northumberland.

History
The club belongs to Queen Elizabeth High School, Hexham. The boathouse used by the school at Tyne Green is shared with Hexham Rowing Club.

Honours

British champions

References

Sport in Northumberland
Rowing clubs in England
Rowing clubs of the River Thames
Hexham
Scholastic rowing in the United Kingdom